Frobisher Bay is an inlet of the Davis Strait in the Qikiqtaaluk Region of Nunavut, Canada. It is located in the southeastern corner of Baffin Island.

The capital of Nunavut, Iqaluit, known as Frobisher Bay from 1942 to 1987, lies near the innermost end of the bay.

Geography
Frobisher Bay has a tapered shape formed by two flanking peninsulas, the Hall Peninsula to the northeast, and the Meta Incognita Peninsula to the southwest. The Bay's funnellike shape ensures that the tidal variance at Iqaluit each day is about 7 to 11 m. This shape is due to the large outlet glacier centred over Foxe Basin during the Pleistocene glaciation, which gouged the Bay's basin, now flooded by the sea.

Within Frobisher Bay itself are a number of bays, inlets and sounds. Among these are Wayne Bay and Ward Inlet (up towards the far northwestern end), and also Newell Sound, Leach Bay and Kneeland Bay (along the southwest shore). Hamlen Bay, Newton Fiord, Royer Cove, and Waddell Bay are located along the northeast shore. Frobisher Bay's whole coastline is marked with innumerable narrow inlets into which flow many small streams. There are high cliffs on both shores, rising to roughly 330 m on the northeast shore, and twice that on the southwest shore as a result of the tilting of the earth's crust locally during the early Tertiary.

Frobisher Bay is also studded with islands. These include Hill Island and Faris Island near Iqaluit, Pugh, Pike, Fletcher and Bruce islands at the mouth of Wayne Bay, Augustus Island in Ward Inlet, and Chase, McLean, Gabriel and Nouyarn islands towards the Bay's mouth.

History

Frobisher Bay is named for the English navigator Sir Martin Frobisher, who, during his search for the Northwest Passage in 1576, became the first European to visit it. Until Hall's voyage in 1861, the Bay was thought by Europeans to be a strait separating Baffin Island from another island.

The first Church of England service recorded on North American soil was a celebration of Holy Communion at Frobisher Bay in the last days of August or early September 1578. The Anglican Church of Canada's Prayer Book fixes the day of commemoration as September 3. The chaplain on Frobisher's voyage was " 'Maister Wolfall (probably Robert Wolfall), minister and preacher', who had been charged by Queen Elizabeth 'to serve God twice a day'."

In popular culture
"Frozen in Frobisher Bay" is a James Gordon song that was featured in the television program Canadian Idol.

References

Further reading

 Andrews, John T. Cumberland Sound and Frobisher Bay, Southeastern Baffin Island, N.W.T. Ottawa, Ont: National Research Council of Canada, 1987. 
 Eggertsson, Olafur, and Dosia Laeyendecker. 1995. "A Dendrochronological Study of the Origin of Driftwood in Frobisher Bay, Baffin Island, N.W.T., Canada". Arctic and Alpine Research. 27, no. 2: 180.
 Finkler, Harold W. Inuit and the Administration of Criminal Justice in the Northwest Territories The Case of Frobisher Bay. Ottawa: Minister of Indian and Northern Affairs, 1976. 
 Grainger, E. H. The Food of Ice Fauna and Zooplankton in Frobisher Bay. Ste-Anne de Bellevue, Que: Arctic Biological Station, Dept. of Fisheries and Oceans, 1985.
 Gullason, Lynda. Engendering Interaction Inuit-European Contact in Frobisher Bay, Baffin Island. Ottawa: National Library of Canada = Bibliothèque nationale du Canada, 2001. 
 Henshaw, Anne Stevens. Central Inuit Household Economies Zooarchaeological, Environmental, and Historical Evidence from Outer Frobisher Bay, Baffin Island, Canada. BAR international series, 871. Oxford, England: Archaeopress, 2000. 
 Mallon, S. T. Inuktitut, Frobisher Bay Version. Yellowknife, N.W.T.: Dept. of Education, 1977.
 Odess, Daniel. Interaction, Adaptation, and Culture Change Lithic Exchange in Frobisher Bay Dorset Society, Baffin Island, Arctic Canada. 1996.
 Roy, Sharat Kumar. The Upper Ordovician Fauna of Frobisher Bay, Baffin Land. 1941.
 Thomson, G. James. A Ring of Urgency An Engineering Memoir : from the Halls of Humberside to the Shores of Frobisher Bay. Scarborough, Ont: Abbeyfield Publishers, 1995.

External links

Iqaluit
Bays of Baffin Island